The Xiguan accent or Xiguan dialect, is a sub-dialect of the Guangzhou dialect of Cantonese, spoken in Saikwan (Xiguan). Cantonese takes Guangzhou dialect as its standard and Guangzhou dialect once took Xiguan as its standard. With an increasing number of outsiders moving in, Xiguan dialect can only be heard among the older population and it is near extinction. The Guangzhouhua Zidian includes Xiguan alongside Nanhai and Hong Kong.

Speakers 
People living in Xiguan have generally lost a Xiguan accent; what they are actually speaking with is the relaxed pronunciation of Xiguan Dialect.

Differences with downtown accent

Differences in the pronunciation of some characters

Confusion of consonants n & l 
Due to Xiguan's near geographical position to Nanhai, both accents spoken in Xiguan and Nanhai feature n-l merger, in which /n/ and /l/ are merged into /l/. However, the feature is less prominent in the Xiguan accent.

Consonant ng 
Speakers of Xiguan Accents pronounce zero consonant as the consonant ng, for instance, "屋(uk7)" as "nguk7" and "壓(aat8)" as "ngaat8".

Vowels i & ei / ai 
Speakers of Xiguan Accents pronounce vowels ei and ai as i. The phenomenon also lies in Nanhai Accents, such as:

Dental consonant 
Additionally, speakers of Xiguan Accents enhance dental consonants. Tense in the oral area, similar to zh, ch and sh in Mandarin without rolling tongue). To be precise, dental consonants are similar to the consonants of 左", "初" and "所" (i.e.,  and ) in Downtown Accents. A saying representing Xiguan Accents goes that Servant, take some money to buy some seadless kaki fruits.

Status

Relationship with downtown accents (especially Dongshan accents) 
Xiguan lies to the west of Taiping Gate. Xiguan is the suburb of Guangzhou and it was administrated by Nanhai County rather than Panyu County (covering former Yuexiu District and former Dongshan District). Therefore, it was not regarded as part of the capital of Guangdong Province. Therefore, Xiguan Dialect should be regarded as suburban accents, distinguished from Downtown Accent, esp. Dongshan Accents. Notwithstanding, Xiguan lies close to the provincial capital, so the gap is narrow.

Cantonese language